Hathaway may refer to:

Commerce
 Hathaway Manufacturing Company, a predecessor of Berkshire Hathaway, an investment vehicle
 Berkshire Hathaway, a holding company
 A brand of dress shirts, formerly made by the C. F. Hathaway Company in Waterville, Maine

Places
Hathaway (Tannersville, New York), listed on the NRHP in Greene County, New York
Hathaway, Louisiana
Hathaway, West Virginia
Hathaway Academy, Grays, Essex, England

Other uses
Hathaway (surname), including a list of people with the name

See also
Hathaway House (disambiguation)